Brais Méndez Portela (born 7 January 1997) is a Spanish professional footballer who plays as an attacking midfielder for La Liga club Real Sociedad and the Spain national team.

Club career

Celta
Born in Mos, Pontevedra, Galicia, Méndez joined RC Celta de Vigo's youth setup in 2012, from Villarreal CF. On 7 September 2014, he made his senior debut with the reserves, starting in a 1–0 Segunda División B away win against Real Murcia.

Méndez scored his first senior goal on 4 September 2016, netting his team's second in a 3–1 victory at CD Palencia. The following 21 August, after spending the whole preseason with the main squad, he renewed his contract until 2021.

On 21 September 2017, Méndez made his professional – and La Liga – debut, starting in the 1–1 home draw against Getafe CF. He scored his first goal in the competition on 31 March 2018, equalising a 1–1 away draw with Athletic Bilbao.

On 30 July 2020, Méndez extended his contract until 2024. The ensuing season was his most prolific with nine goals, including both in a win over Deportivo Alavés at Balaídos on 20 December.

Real Sociedad
On 6 July 2022, Real Sociedad reached an agreement with Celta for the transfer of Méndez, with the player signing a contract until 2028. On his European debut on 8 September, he scored the only goal to help defeat Manchester United at Old Trafford in the group stage of the UEFA Europa League, through a penalty.

International career
After playing for Spain at under-17, under-18 and under-21 levels, Méndez was first called by the full side on 8 November 2018 for matches against Croatia and Bosnia and Herzegovina. He made his debut in the latter fixture, coming on as a 59th-minute substitute for Suso in the 1–0 friendly win in Las Palmas and scoring the only goal.

Personal life
Méndez's father, Modesto (known as Pupi), was also a footballer. A forward, he appeared in one Segunda División match with Deportivo de La Coruña.

Career statistics

Club

International

 Spain score listed first, score column indicates score after each Méndez goal.

References

External links

1997 births
Living people
Spanish footballers
Footballers from Galicia (Spain)
People from Vigo (comarca)
Sportspeople from the Province of Pontevedra
Association football midfielders
La Liga players
Segunda División B players
Celta de Vigo B players
RC Celta de Vigo players
Real Sociedad footballers
Spain youth international footballers
Spain under-21 international footballers
Spain international footballers